A dynamo is a magnetic device originally used as an electric generator.

Dynamo or Dinamo may also refer to:

Places
 Dinamo (Moscow Metro), a station of the Moscow Metro, Moscow, Russia
 Dinamo (Yekaterinburg Metro), a station of the Yekaterinburg Metro, Yekaterinburg, Russia

People
 Dynamo (magician), stage name of English magician Steven Frayne

Arts, entertainment, and media

Fictional entities 
 Dynamo (Fox Feature Syndicate), a 1940s comic book character
 Dynamo, a character from the Mega Man X series
 Dynamo, a comic book character and member of the T.H.U.N.D.E.R. Agents
 Dynamo, one of the "stalkers" from the movie The Running Man
 Captain Dynamo (comics), a fictional comic book superhero
 Crimson Dynamo, the name of several fictional characters in the Marvel Comics universe, most of whom have been supervillains
 Dynamo 5, a fictional superhero team appearing in the comic book of the same name
 Dynamo Duck, the main character in the children's television series The Adventures of Dynamo Duck
Dynamo Joe, a 1980s comic book series
DynaMo, a 1998 BBC educational character

Music

Albums
 Dynamo (Avengers in Sci-Fi album), a 2010 album by Japanese electro-rock band Avengers in Sci-Fi
 Dynamo (Soda Stereo album), a 1992 album by Argentine rock band Soda Stereo

Other music
 Dynamo, a collaboration project of Muriel Moreno and Marc Collin of Nouvelle Vague
 Dynamo Open Air, an annual heavy metal music festival held in the Netherlands

Other arts, entertainment, and media
 DynaMo, a 1998 British educational programme and website
 Dynamo (play), a 1929 play by Eugene O'Neill
 Captain Dynamo (video game), a platform game  developed by Codemasters and released for the Commodore Amiga and other platforms in 1993

Brands and enterprises 
 Dynamo, a brand of laundry detergent, owned by Colgate-Palmolive
 Dynamo Corporation, American manufacturer of pool and air hockey tables

Science, engineering, and technology

Astrophysics 
 Dynamo theory, a theory relating to magnetic fields of celestial bodies
 Solar dynamo, the physical process that generates the Sun's magnetic field

Software 
 DYNAMO (programming language), a simulation language
 Dynamo (storage system), a distributed data store
Amazon DynamoDB, a storage system

Sports

Association football clubs
Dinamo Zagreb, a Croatian football club 
 Dynamo FC (disambiguation)
FC Dinamo București, a Romanian football club
FC Dynamo Kyiv, a Ukrainian football club
Houston Dynamo FC, an American soccer club

Basketball teams
 BC Dynamo Moscow, a Russian basketball team
 BC Dynamo Saint Petersburg, a Russian basketball team
 BC Dinamo Tbilisi, a Georgian basketball team 
 Dinamo Basket Sassari, an Italian basketball team
 CS Dinamo București (basketball), a Romanian basketball team

Ice hockey teams
 Dinamo Riga, an ice hockey team
 HC Dynamo Minsk, an ice hockey team
 HC Dinamo Moscow, an ice hockey team
 HC Dinamo Saint Petersburg, an ice hockey team

Multi-sports clubs
 Dynamo Sports Club, a multi-sports club of the Soviet Union
 SC Dynamo Berlin, a multi-sportsclub in East Berlin, affiliated to SV Dynamo
 SV Dynamo, a multi-sports association of the German Democratic Republic
 CS Dinamo București, a multi-sports association of Ministry of Internal Affairs from Romania

Other sports 
 Durham Dynamos, the limited overs team of Durham County Cricket Club
 Dynamo Kazan Bandy Club
 Dynamo Moscow (bandy club)
 Dynamo Moscow (women's volleyball)
 Dynamo Leningrad (bandy club)
 Futsal Dinamo, a Croatian futsal team
 CS Dinamo București (men's handball), a Romanian handball team

Stadiums

Belarus
 Dinamo Stadium (Minsk), Belarus

Romania
 Dinamo Stadium (Bucharest), Romania

Russia
Dynamo Sports Palace, an indoor sporting arena in Moscow
Dynamo Stadium (Moscow)
Dynamo Stadium (Bryansk)
Dynamo Stadium (Vladivostok)

Ukraine
 Valeriy Lobanovskyi Dynamo Stadium, Kyiv, Ukraine

Uzbekistan
 Dynamo Samarkand Stadium, Samarkand, Uzbekistan

Other uses 
 Dynamo (typeface), a typeface designed by K. Sommer for Ludwig & Mayer in 1930
 Dunwich Dynamo, an annual bicycle ride from London to Dunwich, England
Jugendkulturhaus Dynamo, a cultural center for youth in Zürich
 Operation Dynamo, the World War II mass evacuation of Allied soldiers from Dunkirk
 In physics, dynamo theory is a mechanism by which a celestial body generates a magnetic field